Tequesta Point is a complex of residential high-rises in Downtown Miami, Florida, United States. It consists of three skyscraper buildings located on Brickell Key, an urban island to the east of the Central Business District. Three Tequesta Point, the tallest of the three, was completed in 2001. It is 480 ft (146 m) tall, and has 46 floors. Two Tequesta Point, the central building of the complex, was completed in 1999. It is 410 ft (125 m) tall, and has 40 floors. One Tequesta Point, the original building of the complex, was built in 1995. It contains 30 floors and is at the northern end of Brickell Key. 
The buildings, when opened, were some of the tallest Miami had to offer; however, since the start of the building boom in the early 2000s, many skyscrapers which are much taller than the Tequesta Point buildings have been built.  Nevertheless, because the complex is located directly on Biscayne Bay, the buildings can still be seen from Miami Beach and from boats in the bay.

See also
List of tallest buildings in Miami

External links 
Tequesta Point Complex on Emporis

Buildings and structures completed in 1995
Buildings and structures completed in 1999
Buildings and structures completed in 2001
Residential skyscrapers in Miami
1995 establishments in Florida